Bury Art Museum and Sculpture Centre, formerly known as Bury Museum and Art Gallery, is a public museum, archives, and art gallery in the town of Bury, Greater Manchester, northern England, owned by Bury Council. Built in 1901, the Museum's buildings were restored and reopened in 2005.

History
Bury Art Museum's collection was established, in commemoration of Queen Victoria's Diamond Jubilee in 1897, with the gift of more than 200 oil paintings, watercolours, prints and ceramics accumulated by the Victorian paper manufacturer Thomas Wrigley (1808–1880), on the condition that suitable premises should be built to house the collection. The present building was designed by the Manchester firm of Woodhouse and Willoughby, and was opened by Frederick Stanley, 16th Earl of Derby on 9 October 1901. The town's Museum opened in the basement of the Art Gallery in 1907.

Collections
The museum's Wrigley Collection is an assemblage of more than two hundred oil paintings, watercolours, prints and ceramics, which includes works by J. M. W. Turner, John Constable, Edwin Landseer, and George Clausen. Donations of other artworks quickly followed the Museum's opening, including donations from the town's Member of Parliament James Kenyon (1846–1924) and many others. Other paintings include works by Henry Dawson, John Bagnold Burgess, and Joseph Noel Paton. There are twentieth-century paintings by artists such as Victor Pasmore and Edward Burra, and the Museum also holds more recent twenty-first-century art works.

Restoration
In 2005, a £1.2 million refurbishment was carried out, designed to provide a brand new museum, art gallery and library all under one roof. This includes a combined Museum and Archives Centre which, based on a radical re-think, uses artefacts, documentation and art to tell the story of the town. The council decided, in 2006, to sell Lowry's painting The Riverbank at auction in order to fund part of its social services budget shortfall which resulted in the Museums, Libraries and Archives Council (MLA) removing its accredited museum status. Bury Museum and Art Gallery was renamed as Bury Art Museum in 2011. The most recent renovation includes modern artefacts such as iPods and electric iRobot vacuum cleaners.

Gallery

See also

Listed buildings in Bury
List of museums in Greater Manchester

References

External links
Bury Art Museum and Sculpture Centre
Bury Art Museum and Sculpture Centre at Bury Council website
Bury Art Museum at Visitbury.com

Grade II listed buildings in the Metropolitan Borough of Bury
Museums in Greater Manchester
Art museums and galleries in Greater Manchester
Local museums in Greater Manchester
Tourist attractions in the Metropolitan Borough of Bury
Museums established in 1901
1901 establishments in England